The 2019 Indian general election in Maharashtra held in April 2019. These were held for 48 seats in 4 phases; 11 April (7 seats), 18 April (10 seats), 23 April (14 seats) and 29 April 2019 (17 seats).

The major contenders in the state are the United Progressive Alliance (UPA) and National Democratic Alliance (NDA). UPA consisted of the Indian National Congress and the Nationalist Congress Party whereas the NDA consisted of the Bharatiya Janata Party and the Shiv Sena.

In February 2019, BJP and Shiv Sena again announced alliance with 25 seats for BJP and 23 for Shiv Sena.

In March 2019, Congress and NCP also announced their alliance with each contesting 26 and 22 seats respectively. Of the 26 seats of INC, 1 seat each would be given to Bahujan Vikas Aaghadi (BVA) and Swabhimani Shetkari Saghtana (SSS). Similarly, NCP would also forgo of two seats; one each to SSS and one to Yuva Swabhiman Party.

Result

Alliance wise

Party wise

Constituency wise
Keys:

1 Resigned from seat on 14 September 2019 to join BJP, lost subsequent by election to Shriniwas Dadasaheb Patil of NCP.
Region-Wise Breakup:

National Democratic Alliance(NDA)

United Progressive Alliance(UPA)

Results Analysis

 www.Elections.in>maharashtra

Maharashtra Lok Sabha Election Results 2019 - Constituency Wise And Party Wise Result.

2. www.indiatoday.in

Maharashtra Lok Sabha Election Result 2019 - BJP - Shiv Sena alliance wins 41 out of 48.

Assembly segments wise lead of Parties

Candidates

Western Maharashtra

Vidarbha

Marathwada

Thane+Konkan

North Maharashtra

References

Indian general elections in Maharashtra
2010s in Maharashtra
2019 Indian general election by state or union territory
2019 in Maharashtra